Tonny Holst-Christensen is a former Danish badminton player. In 1962 the Badminton Association of Denmark decided not to enter Tonny in the All England Championships and she had to pay for the trip to England out of her own pocket. She then teamed up with Judy Devlin and remarkably won the title. She also won the Danish National Championship in 1956 and 1960 and was a member of the 1960 Uber Cup team.

Medal Record at the All England Badminton Championships

References

Danish female badminton players